Sarutasawa Tameike is an earthfill dam located in Akita Prefecture in Japan. The dam is used for irrigation. The catchment area of the dam is 0.8 km2. The dam impounds about 10  ha of land when full and can store 930 thousand cubic meters of water. The construction of the dam was completed in 1938.

References

Dams in Akita Prefecture
1938 establishments in Japan